Senator Lathrop may refer to:

Samuel Lathrop (1772–1846), Massachusetts State Senate
Steve Lathrop (born 1957), Nebraska State Senate